Bhavan's Gangabux Kanoria Vidyamandir (BGKV) is a private secondary school in Bidhannagar, West Bengal, India, established in 1984. It is affiliated with the Central Board of Secondary Education, New Delhi and administered by the Bharatiya Vidya Bhavan. It was named after Seth Gangabux Kanoria, a Marwari businessman. The school was founded by Dr. K. M. Munshi on November 7, 1938.

References

External links
 

Schools affiliated with the Bharatiya Vidya Bhavan
Primary schools in West Bengal
High schools and secondary schools in West Bengal
Private schools in Kolkata
Educational institutions established in 1984
1984 establishments in West Bengal